The City was XM Satellite Radio's Commercial-Free Urban Top 40 and Urban Contemporary music Channel. The service signed on September 25, 2001. It was originally launched and programmed by Radio One, Inc., but was reverted to XM Radio. The channel ceased operations on November 11, 2008 and was replaced by Hip-Hop Nation, also on channel 67.  XM 68 The Heat flipped from Rhythmic Top 40 to Urban Contemporary after the switch, however Urban Contemporary was unsuccessful on channel 68 and as of April 2009 the station is now more of an Urban-Leaning Rhythmic. The channel was known from their slogan "From the satellite, to your hood!!". The City was also on Channel 847 on DirecTV.

The City focused mostly on hit-driven R&B/Hip-Hop/Urban Pop tracks from today's hottest artists who were exclusive to that genre. The channel was also commercial-free with DJs, but like a terrestrial Urban Contemporary radio station the music was censored, leaving the uncensored product to their "RAW" Uncut Hip-Hop channel. The channel's last few years on the air, it was often debated whether it was Urban Contemporary or Urban Top 40 due to certain playlist choices. On air staff knew about the closing of The City months before it happened, but were not allowed to say anything about it on the air.

Select programming that was on XM 67 The City was brought over to Hip-Hop Nation due to high ratings. This includes...
Nina Nine, night host on The City, now evening host on Hip-Hop Nation.
Fat Boy Radio, Saturday Night Mixshow on XM 67 The City hosted by Dj S&S and others now on Hip-Hop Nation.
Some programming that was not brought over to Hip-Hop Nation is now online.

Also, XM 68 the Heat, their replacement is very similar to what The City was, playing censored versions of songs, commercial free with deejays.

In May 2012, DJ Reece relaunched 67 The City as an online radio station playing the same Urban/Hip-Hop music free of charge available on mobile phones, select vehicles with internet connection, and computers. http://www.67thecity.com

Artists heard on the channel include Ne-Yo, Usher, Plies, Young Jeezy, LL Cool J, Lil Wayne, T-Pain, Flo Rida, Bow Wow, Omarion, Bobby Valentino, Rich Boy, Rick Ross, The-Dream, Birdman, Lil Jon, Soulja Boy, Nelly, Snoop Dogg,  Shawty Lo, Andre 3000, Ciara, Ashanti, Keyshia Cole, Chris Brown, Mariah Carey, and many more.

XM Satellite Radio channels
Radio stations established in 2001
Radio stations disestablished in 2008
Defunct radio stations in the United States